Adam Nathaniel Yauch (August 5, 1964 – May 4, 2012), better known under the stage name MCA, was an American rapper, bass player, filmmaker and a founding member of the hip hop group Beastie Boys.  Besides his musical work, he also directed many of the band's music videos and did much of their promotional photography, often using the pseudonym Nathaniel Hörnblowér for such work.

Yauch founded Oscilloscope Laboratories, an independent film production and distribution company based in New York City. As a Buddhist, he was involved in the Tibetan independence movement and organized the Tibetan Freedom Concert. He died in 2012 from parotid cancer, after which Beastie Boys disbanded.

Early life and education
Born in Brooklyn, New York City, Yauch was an only child. His father Noel was an architect, and his mother Frances was a social worker. Yauch's mother was Jewish and his father Catholic, but he had a non-religious upbringing in Brooklyn Heights, Brooklyn.

Yauch attended Edward R. Murrow High School in Brooklyn's Midwood neighborhood. In high school, he taught himself to play the bass guitar and formed Beastie Boys with John Berry, Kate Schellenbach, and Michael Diamond. They played their first show—while still a hardcore punk band in the vein of Reagan Youth—on his 17th birthday. He attended Bard College for two years before dropping out.

His stage name, MCA, is an acronym for "Master of Ceremonies Adam."

Beastie Boys

Beastie Boys, a hip-hop trio, released their first album Licensed to Ill on Def Jam Records when Yauch was 22. He directed many of Beastie Boys' music videos, often under the pseudonym Nathaniel Hörnblowér.

In 2002, Yauch constructed a recording studio in New York City called Oscilloscope Laboratories. He began an independent film distributing company called Oscilloscope Pictures. He directed the 2006 Beastie Boys concert film Awesome; I Fuckin' Shot That!.

Beastie Boys had sold 40 million records worldwide by 2010. In April 2012, the group was inducted into the Rock and Roll Hall of Fame. Yauch was inducted in absentia due to his illness. His bandmates paid tribute to him; a letter from Yauch was read to the audience.

In 2011, Yauch received the Charles Flint Kellogg Award in Arts and Letters from Bard College, the college he attended for two years. The award is "given in recognition of a significant contribution to the American artistic or literary heritage".

Other independent work

He directed the 2008 film Gunnin' For That #1 Spot about eight high school basketball prospects at the Boost Mobile Elite 24 Hoops Classic at Rucker Park in Harlem, New York City.

Yauch produced Build a Nation (2007), the comeback album from hardcore/punk band Bad Brains. When Bad Brains released Into the Future (2012), the band dedicated the album to Yauch, their longtime friend and backer, who had died several months previously.

In addition, Oscilloscope Laboratories also distributed Kelly Reichardt's Wendy and Lucy (2008) and Oren Moverman's The Messenger (2009).

Personal life and views

Yauch was a practicing Buddhist. He became an important voice in the Tibetan independence movement, creating the Milarepa Fund, a nonprofit organization devoted to Tibetan independence and organized several benefit concerts to support the cause, including the Tibetan Freedom Concert.

In 1995, while attending a speech by the Dalai Lama at Harvard University, he met his wife, Tibetan American Dechen Wangdu. They married in 1998 and had a daughter, Tenzin Losel, the same year.

In 1998, during the MTV Video Music Awards, when receiving the Video Vanguard Award, Yauch condemned America's wars in Muslim countries and prejudice against Muslims and Arabs. Artist Cihan Kaan wrote an obituary for Al Jazeera that Yauch was "Muslim Americans' hero, and America's personal Jewish Gandhi".

Illness, death and legacy

In 2009, Yauch was diagnosed with a cancerous parotid gland and lymph node. He underwent surgery and radiation therapy, delaying the release of Hot Sauce Committee Part Two and the subsequent tour. He was unable to appear in music videos for the album. Yauch became a vegan on the recommendation of his doctors. At the time, Yauch described the cancer as "very treatable".

Yauch died at age 47 on May 4, 2012.

In his last will and testament, Yauch left instructions that his music could not be used in advertising, though the legal validity of such an instruction has been questioned.

On May 3, 2013, ceremonies were held to rename the Palmetto Playground in Brooklyn Heights to Adam Yauch Park.

Discography

with Beastie Boys
 Licensed to Ill (1986)
 Paul's Boutique (1989)
 Check Your Head (1992)
 Ill Communication (1994)
 Hello Nasty (1998)
 To the 5 Boroughs (2004)
 The Mix-Up (2007)
 Hot Sauce Committee Part Two (2011)

References

External links

 
 
 
 
 
 Village Voice Slideshow Dedication of Adam Yauch Park

Interviews
 Interview  in Shambhala Sun
 Audio interview on the.LIFE Files
 Interview on "Gunnin' For That #1 Spot" at IFC, June 2008

1964 births
2012 deaths
Alternative hip hop musicians
American Buddhists
American male rappers
American music video directors
American punk rock bass guitarists
American male bass guitarists
Bard College alumni
Beastie Boys members
Converts to Buddhism
Deaths from cancer in New York (state)
Deaths from salivary gland cancer
Grammy Award winners
Jewish punk rock musicians
Jewish rappers
Jewish American musicians
Rap rock musicians
Rappers from Brooklyn
Tibetan Buddhists from the United States
American LGBT rights activists
American baritones
Guitarists from New York City
American male guitarists
20th-century American guitarists
Edward R. Murrow High School alumni
Feminist musicians
American people of German descent